Roland MacKenzie (1907-1988) was an American amateur golfer whose career included three selections to Walker Cup teams and five times qualifying for the U.S. Amateur, earning him a reputation as one of America's finest golfers.

Life and career
Born on March 13, 1907, in the District of Columbia, MacKenzie graduated from Western High School in Washington, D.C., and Brown University, Class of 1929, in Providence, Rhode Island. He took up golf in 1921 at the age of 14, and by 1924 had won three invitational tourneys and qualified for the U.S. Amateur held at Merion Golf Club, in Ardmore, Pennsylvania. In the 1924 U.S. Amateur at Merion, his first national exposure, at age 17, he qualified for the 32-man match-play bracket, and drew George Von Elm as his partner.

In 1925, MacKenzie won the qualifying medal in the U.S. Amateur held at Oakmont Country Club in suburban Pittsburgh, Pennsylvania, with a course-record 71 and 74 for 145, two ahead of Bobby Jones and Jesse Guilford.

In 1926, at age 19, while just a freshman at Brown, he was named to the 1926 Walker Cup team with Jesse Guilford, Francis Ouimet, Watts Gunn, Jess Sweetser, Bobby Jones, George Von Elm, and Robert Gardner in the competition held at the Old Course at St Andrews in Scotland. In a preliminary round, MacKenzie defeated one of the most skillful putters in Scotland, William John Guild, 3 and 2, eliciting praise from the press: 

His record as the youngest player selected for Walker Cup play stood for 5 decades.

MacKenzie's best showing in the U.S. Amateur was in 1927, advancing to the semi-finals before losing to Chick Evans in a 37-hole battle.

In 1928, he was again named to the Walker Cup team for the match held at the Chicago Golf Club in Wheaton, Illinois, with Charles Evans Jr., Francis Ouimet, Watts Gunn, Jess Sweetser, Harrison R. Johnston, and George Von Elm. His last appearance on the Walker Cup team was in the 1930 match, held at the Royal St George's Golf Club in Sandwich, England, with Harrison R. Johnston, George J. Voigt, George Von Elm, Donald K. Moe, Oscar Willing, and Francis Ouimet. In his three years on the Walker Cup team, MacKenzie compiled a 5–1 record.

In 1931 he went to California and worked as an assistant movie director, counting Howard Hughes, Will Rogers, and Bing Crosby among his golfing friends. In the mid-1930s, he briefly turned professional and worked as golf pro at the Congressional Country Club in Bethesda, Maryland, the Broadmoor Golf Club in Colorado Springs, Colorado, and the Ponte Vedra Club in Florida.

Over the years, MacKenzie compiled a record that included Middle Atlantic Amateur titles 23 years apart (a tournament record), eight appearances in the U.S. Amateur between 1923 and 1948, membership on three Walker Cup teams, 1926, 1928 and 1930, and four Maryland State Golf Association father-and-son tournaments, playing with a son or a stepson. In 1965, he won the Maryland State Golf Association's seniors tournament.

He was at various times the club champion at the Elkridge Club, the Baltimore Country Club and the Green Spring Valley Hunt Club. He was a member or past-member of the Gulf Stream Club in Delray Beach, Florida, the Country Club of North Carolina, and the Pinehurst Country Club. Two of his farm properties were developed as golf courses, "Oak Lea Farm" in Silver Spring, Maryland, as Argyle Country Club, and “Shamrock Farms” in Pinehurst, North Carolina, as Foxfire Resort & Country Club.

MacKenzie died at the age of 81 on Saturday, November 19, 1988, at his home in Owings Mills, Maryland.

Awards and honors
In 1975 MacKenzie was inducted into the Brown University Hall of Fame, and in 1983 he was inducted into the Middle Atlantic Golf Association Hall of Fame.

References

External links

American male golfers
Amateur golfers
Golfers from Maryland
1907 births
1988 deaths